Old Balornock is a village in City of Glasgow, Scotland.

Areas of Glasgow
Springburn